Almudena Fajardo Ayuso (born 11 August 1996) is a Spanish female professional soft-tip and steel-tip darts player who currently plays in the World Darts Federation (WDF) events. She is an EDU European Darts Champion and first Spanish female player who played in the final of the WDF Europe Cup competition. She was qualified for the 2023 WDF World Darts Championship.

Career
Fajardo is one of the most successful players from Spain. In 2017, she won two bronze medals in singles and cricket competition at the EDU European Darts Championship in Caorle. A year later, she repeated her success in the cricket competition. In subsequent international competitions, she maintained a good level, however, she was more successful only in the national competitions. In 2022, she was advanced to the EDU European Darts Championship finals for the first time and won her first gold medal in cricket competition, defeated Josipa Brzić. In the singles competition, she lost to Lucia Jankovská in the final.

At the end of September 2022, she was selected by the national federation to participate in the 2022 WDF Europe Cup held in her country. This is her first international competition on the steel-tip darts organised by World Darts Federation. On the second day of the tournament, she advanced to the finals of the singles competition, defeating the favorites Deta Hedman, Monique Lessmeister and Veronika Ihász. In the final, she lost to Beau Greaves by 4–7 in legs and winning the first medal for Spain.

In late February 2023, Fajardo made her debut in the 2023 PDC Women's Series.

World Championship results

WDF
 2023:

Performance timeline

Career finals

WDF major finals: 2 (2 runners-up)

References

Living people
1996 births
Female darts players
Spanish darts players